The Counterfeit Killer is a 1968 American crime film directed by Józef Lejtes and written by Steven Bochco and Harold Clements. The film stars Jack Lord, Shirley Knight, Jack Weston, Charles Drake, Joseph Wiseman and Don Hanmer. The film was released in May 1968, by Universal Pictures.

Plot
Is there a link between the murder of five foreign sailors from the East whose bodies have been found on the San Pedro waterfront and the issue of one million counterfeit dollars in the USA? Don Owens, an undercover agent, assisted by Angie, a beautiful but embittered widow who has fallen for him, does his best to untangle the knot.

Cast 
Jack Lord as Don Owens
Shirley Knight as Angie Peterson
Jack Weston as Randolph Riker
Charles Drake as Dolan
Joseph Wiseman as Rajeski
Don Hanmer as O'Hara
Robert Pine as Ed 
George Tyne as George
Cal Bartlett as Reggie
Hans Heyde as Keyser
L. Q. Jones as Hotel Clerk
David Renard as Ambulance Attendant
Nicholas Colasanto as Plainclothesman
Mercedes McCambridge as Frances

References

External links 
 
 

1968 films
American crime drama films
1968 crime drama films
Universal Pictures films
Counterfeit money in film
1960s English-language films
1960s American films